Gynatrix pulchella, the hemp bush or Aboriginal hemp, is a dioecious flowering shrub in the family Malvaceae, endemic to south-east Australia. It grows to 3 metres in height and has white or cream flowers. The species occurs in New South Wales, the Australian Capital Territory, Victoria and Tasmania.

References

Malveae
Malvales of Australia
Flora of the Australian Capital Territory
Flora of New South Wales
Flora of Tasmania
Flora of Victoria (Australia)
Plants described in 1809
Taxa named by Carl Ludwig Willdenow
Taxa named by Friedrich Alefeld